Garibaldi is an underground metro station that serve  Line 1 on the Naples Metro, adjacent and connected through an underground passage to the Central railway station, Circumvesuviana and Line 2. It was opened on 31 December 2013 as a one-station extension from Università.

See also
Railway stations in Italy
List of Naples metro stations

References

Naples Metro stations
2013 establishments in Italy
Railway stations opened in 2013
Railway stations in Italy opened in the 21st century